N. C. Samantsinhar (2 March 1912 – 18 October 1982) was an Indian politician who served as a member of 2nd Lok Sabha from Bhubaneswar Lok Sabha constituency representing the Indian National Congress and a runner-up for 1962 Indian vice presidential election securing only 14 votes.

Personal life 
Samantsinhar was born on 2 March 1912 in Puri district (then in Bengal Presidency in British India) to Maheshwar Samantsinhar. He was married to Manorama and had two sons. His resided in South Avenue, New Delhi.

Samantsinhar died in Odisha on 18 October 1982, at the age of 70.

References

1912 births
1982 deaths
20th-century Indian politicians
Indian National Congress politicians from Odisha
India MPs 1957–1962
People from Puri district